Jessica Alice Feinmann Wade  (born October 1988) is a British physicist in the Blackett Laboratory at Imperial College London, specialising in Raman spectroscopy. Her research investigates polymer-based organic light emitting diodes (OLEDs). Her public engagement work in science, technology, engineering, and mathematics (STEM) advocates for women in physics as well as tackling systemic biases such as gender and racial bias on Wikipedia.

Education and early life
Wade is the daughter of two physicians, and her grandfather Leslie Feinmann was also a physician who was born in a Jewish ghetto in Manchester to a Russian-speaking mother and a father of Lithuanian Jewish and German Jewish descent. She was educated at South Hampstead High School, graduating in 2007. Wade subsequently enrolled in a foundation course in art and design at the Chelsea College of Art and Design, and in 2012 completed a Master of Science (MSci) degree in physics at Imperial College London. She continued at Imperial, completing her PhD in physics in 2016, where her work in nanometrology in organic semiconductors was supervised by Ji-Seon Kim.

Research and career 
Wade's research interests are in materials science, chiral materials and circular polarisation. , Wade is a postdoctoral research associate in plastic electronics in the solid-state physics group at Imperial College London, focusing on developing and characterising light-emitting polymer thin films, working with Alasdair Campbell and Matthew Fuchter. Wade and coworkers have recently discovered how to template chiral materials at functional interfaces, paving the way toward tunable chiroptical technologies. 

Her research has been published in scientific journals such as the Journal of Physical Chemistry C, the Journal of the American Chemical Society, the Journal of Materials Chemistry, ACS Nano, Advanced Functional Materials, The Journal of Chemical Physics, Advanced Electronic Materials, ChemComm and Energy & Environmental Science. She has co-authored research papers with James Durrant, Henning Sirringhaus, Jenny Nelson, Donal Bradley, and Ji-Seon Kim. 

, according to Web of Science, she has published 59 items and cited 1124 times.

Public engagement 
Wade has contributed to public engagement to increase  gender equality in science, technology, engineering, and mathematics (STEM) subjects. She represented the UK on the United States Department of State funded International Visitor Leadership Program Hidden No More, and served on the WISE Campaign Young Women's Board and Women's Engineering Society (WES) Council, working with teachers across the country through the Stimulating Physics Network (including keynote talks at education fairs and teacher conferences). Wade has been critical of expensive campaigns to encourage girls into science where there is an implication that only a small minority would be interested, or that girls can study the "chemical composition of lipsticks and nail varnish". She estimates that £5m or £6m is spent in the UK to promote a scientific career for women but with little measurement of the results.

Wade has made a large contribution to a Wikipedia campaign that encourages the creation of Wikipedia articles about notable female academics, in order to promote female role models in STEM. Wade has created new Wikipedia biographical articles to raise the profile of minorities in STEM. She told Chemistry World in mid-2019 that of the 600 articles about female scientists she has written, 6 have been deleted because of the notability issue. Yet, Wade said, the site has articles about the most obscure sports players and forgotten pop songs. As of February 2020, she had written over 900 biographies on Wikipedia. By January 2021, this figure had risen to 1,200. By October 2022, it was over 1,750.

Wade coordinated a team for the 6th International Women in Physics Conference, resulting in an invitation to discuss the Institute of Physics (IOP) gender balance work in Germany. She also supports the engagement of school students through school activities and festivals, and the organisation of a series of events for girls at Imperial College London, which she has funded with grants from the Royal Academy of Engineering (RAEng), the Royal Society of Chemistry (RSC) and the Biochemical Society. In 2015 Wade won the science engagement activity I'm a Scientist, Get me out of here! and received £500, which she used to run a greenlight4girls day in the Department of Physics at Imperial College London. She has also written a children's book on materials and nanoscience called Nano: The Spectacular Science of the Very (Very) Small. The book is illustrated by Melissa Castrillón and is published by Walker Books.

Wade serves on the IOP London and South East Committee, the IOP Women in Physics Committee and the Juno transparency and opportunity committee at Imperial. She cites her influences as Sharmadean Reid, Lesley Cohen, Jenny Nelson and Angela Saini, particularly her book Inferior. Her outreach work has been covered by NPR, the BBC, Sky News, HuffPost, ABC News, Physics World, El País, CNN, Nature, New Scientist, and The Guardian.

Wade was interviewed as part of TEDx London Women, held on 1 December 2018. With Ben Britton and Christopher Jackson, she co-authored The reward and risk of social media for academics in the journal Nature Reviews Chemistry.

Gender bias on Wikipedia
A controversy regarding allegations that insufficient coverage within the English-language Wikipedia is being given to women making contributions to science became widely noted when the 12 April 2019 Washington Post published an op-ed entitled The Black Hole Photo Is Just One Example of Championing Women in Science, co-authored by Zaringhalam and Wade. In part, the article decried that previous discussions among Wikipedia's volunteer editors resulted in the biographical entries originally created by Wade for some female scientists non-inclusion on the website, one from among hundreds of articles on women scientists that Wade had contributed to that time, with perhaps approximately one percent of these submissions declined.

With regard to one such article, Wade had heard about nuclear chemist Clarice Phelps from Kit Chapman, who had been conducting research for his book Superheavy: Making and Breaking the Periodic Table (2019) with intention "to make science more accessible. I hope that looking back and seeing this cast and some of the diversity that’s reflected in the past, we can get more diversity in the future." Wade created a short Wikipedia biography of Phelps in September 2018. The deletion of that article on 11 February 2019 led to a prolonged editorial discussion and, approaching a type of dispute discouraged among the website's volunteer administrators, its repeated restoration and re-deletion. Chemistry World said: Wade told Chemistry World she believes such omissions of scientific researchers from coverage in Wikipedia are regrettable, stating her impression that it accepts entries for even the most obscure popular-media figures. By January 2020, there was a consensus to restore the article, as by then new sources had become available.

Awards and honours
Wade has received several awards for contributions to science, science communication, diversity, and inclusion. In 2015, Wade was awarded the Institute of Physics Early Career Physics Communicator Prize and the Imperial College Union award for contribution to college life, and was the winner of the Colour Zone in I'm a Scientist, Get Me Out of Here, an online science engagement project run by Mangorolla CIC. The next year, Wade received the Institute of Physics's Jocelyn Bell Burnell Medal and Prize for Women in Physics 2016.

In 2017, Wade won the Robert Perrin Award for Materials Science from the Institute of Materials, Minerals and Mining, and Imperial College's Julia Higgins Medal in recognition of her work to support gender equality. She was invited to the interdisciplinary science conference Science Foo Camp at the Googleplex in California.

In 2018, Wade won the Daphne Jackson Medal and Prize for "acting as an internationally-recognised ambassador for STEM". In December she was named as one of Nature's 10 people who mattered in science that year. She received an honourable mention in the Wikimedian of the Year award by Wikipedia co-founder Jimmy Wales, for her "year long effort to write about underrepresented scientists and engineers on Wikipedia", and the following year was chosen as Wikimedian of the Year by her national chapter, Wikimedia UK.

Wade was awarded the British Empire Medal (BEM) in the 2019 Birthday Honours for services to gender diversity in science. Her employer honoured her that year with its Leadership Award for Societal Engagement. Also in 2019, Wade was named as the 44th 'Most Influential Woman in UK Tech' by Computer Weekly. During the same year, Casio released a scientific calculator in Spain bearing Wade's picture in a series of 12 calculators commemorating historically notable female scientists.

In 2023, she was one of the six women chosen by Nature to comment on their plans for International Women's Day. The others were Gihan Kamel, Martina Anto-Ocrah, Sandra Diaz, Aster Gebrekirstos and Tanya Monro.

References

1988 births
Living people
21st-century British physicists
21st-century British women scientists
Alumni of Chelsea College of Arts
Alumni of Imperial College London
British materials scientists
British Wikimedians
British women physicists
People educated at South Hampstead High School
Recipients of the British Empire Medal
Science communicators
Wikipedia people
Women in optics
Women materials scientists and engineers